The Croatian Basketball Federation is a non-profit organization and the national sports governing body of basketball in Croatia.

It was founded on 19 December 1948 as a member of the larger Basketball Federation of Yugoslavia. On 19 January 1992, the HKS joined the International Basketball Federation (FIBA). Croatia competes in the European region of FIBA.

The Federation runs the men's national team and the women's national team.

Major competitions

Current champions

List of presidents

Anton Kovačev (1995–?)
Boris Lalić (?–?)
Marijan Hanžeković (1998–1999)
Damir Skansi (1999–?)
Ivan Šuker (2002–2004)
Danko Radić (2004–2015)
Ivan Šuker (2015–2016)
Stojko Vranković (2016–present)

References

External links
  

Basketball in Croatia
Basketball
Basketball governing bodies in Europe
Sports organizations established in 1948